Castanopsis wallichii is a species of plant in the family Fagaceae. It is a tree found in Peninsular Malaysia and Singapore. It is threatened by habitat loss.

References

wallichii
Trees of Malaya
Vulnerable plants
Taxonomy articles created by Polbot
Taxa named by Joseph Dalton Hooker